Henrietta von Osterhausen (died 6 November 1727, Dresden), was a German-Polish aristocrat. She is known as the mistress of Augustus II the Strong.

She was a lady-in-waiting to the Maria Josepha of Austria. She replaced Erdmuta Zofia von Dieskau as royal mistress in 1720.  When the affair was over, Maria Josepha suggested that she become a nun. She did live for the Ursuline convent in Prague, but stayed there only as a guest for a couple of months. 
She married the noble Albrecht Zygmunt von Zeigut-Stanisławski on 22 February 1724.

References

 von Weber K., Archiv für die sächsische Geschichte, Wydawnictwo Bernharda Tauchnitza, t. 10, Lipsk 1872, ss. 218-222.

Year of birth missing
1727 deaths
Mistresses of Augustus the Strong
Polish ladies-in-waiting